Aashiq Vanna Divasam (released internationally as The Day Ashiq Came) is a 2018 Indian Malayalam-language children's drama film directed by Krish Kymal and starring Priyamani and Naseer Latif.

Cast 
Priyamani as Shiny
Nasser Latif as Maash
 Kanchanamma as Lakshmi 
Ambika Mohan as Mariya 
Kalasala Babu
Irshad
Kalabhavan Haneef
Baby Piya 
Master Dupath

Production 
The film is directed, written and cinematographed by Krish Kymal of  Olappeeppi (2016) fame while Naseer Lathif produced the film in addition to acting. This film marks Priyamani's return to Malayalam cinema. Aashiq Vanna Divasam is about inter-caste marriage. The film began production in early 2017 with the first schedule in Kochi. The poem "Aaru Njanakanam" was included in this film. The film finished production in late 2017.

Reception 
A critic wrote that "Aashiq Vanna Divasam faces the problem of how to keep the audience engaged till they are led to the major theme. The conflict is apt for the drama but the issue is how long you bear the same thing that gets repeated? The mediocre treatment conveys the same impact".

Awards and nominations 
Krish Kymal was one among the directors nominated for the Kerala State Film Award for Best Director. Naseer Latif won the Honorable Jury Mention - Actor award at the Dada Saheb Phalke Film Festival. The film was screened at various film festivals.

References

External links